Progress M-28 was a Russian unmanned Progress cargo spacecraft, which was launched in July 1995 to resupply the Mir space station.

Launch
Progress M-28 launched on 20 July 1995 from the Baikonur Cosmodrome in Kazakhstan. It used a Soyuz-U rocket.

Docking
Progress M-28 docked with the forward port of the Mir Core Module on 22 July 1995 at 05:39:37 UTC, and was undocked on 4 September 1995 at 05:09:53 UTC.

Decay
It remained in orbit until 4 September 1995, when it was deorbited. The mission ended at 08:58:55 UTC.

See also

 1995 in spaceflight
 List of Progress missions
 List of uncrewed spaceflights to Mir

References

Progress (spacecraft) missions
1995 in Kazakhstan
Spacecraft launched in 1995
Spacecraft which reentered in 1995
Spacecraft launched by Soyuz-U rockets